Akram Hossain Khan, MBE (born 29 July 1974) is an English dancer and choreographer of Bangladeshi descent. His background is rooted in his classical kathak training and contemporary dance.

Career
Khan was born in Lambeth, London, England, into a family from Dhaka, Bangladesh. He began dancing and trained in the classical South Asian dance form of Kathak at the age of seven. He studied with Pratap Pawar, later becoming his disciple. He began his stage career in the Adventures of Mowgli tour 1984–1985 produced by the Academy of Indian Dance, now Akademi South Asian Dance. At the age of 13, he was cast in Peter Brook's Shakespeare Company production of Mahabharata, touring the world between 1987 and 1989 and appearing in the televised version of the play broadcast in 1988.

Following later studies in Contemporary Dance at De Montfort University and Performing Arts at the Northern School of Contemporary Dance and a period working with Anne Teresa De Keersmaeker's Brussels based X-Group project, he began presenting solo performances of his work in the 1990s.

In August 2000, he launched Akram Khan Company, founded alongside former dancer Farooq Chaudhry. His first full-length work Kaash, a collaboration with Anish Kapoor and Nitin Sawhney, was performed at the Edinburgh Festival in 2002.

As choreographer-in-residence and later associate artist at the Southbank Centre, he presented a recital with Pandit Birju Maharaj and Sri Pratap Pawar; and A God of Small Tales, a piece for mature women for which he collaborated with writer Hanif Kureishi. He remained an associate artist at the Southbank Centre until April 2005, the first non-musician to be afforded this status, and is currently an associate artist at Sadler's Wells Theatre. In 2005, he was appointed a Member of the Order of the British Empire (MBE) in the 2005 New Year Honours for his services to dance.

In 2008, he co-starred with Juliette Binoche in a dance-drama piece called in-i at the Royal National Theatre, London.

In summer 2006, Khan was invited by Kylie Minogue to choreograph a section of her Showgirl: The Homecoming Tour. Khan appeared as a huge projection behind the singer as she performed. The songs were set in an Indian temple scenario, inspired by a trip Minogue made to Sri Lanka. He has made pieces for the Ballet Boyz and Cloud Gate Dance Theater of Taiwan.

Khan and his dance company performed at the 2012 London Olympics opening ceremony. Live music was provided by Emeli Sandé singing "Abide With Me".

In 2014, he choreographed for a ballet company for the first time, which was a World War I-themed ballet titled Dust, for the English National Ballet. Khan and Tamara Rojo danced the lead roles.

The Manchester International Festival announced a co-production of Giselle between themselves English National Ballet and Sadler's Wells Theatre that was directed by Khan and performed at the Palace Theatre, Manchester in September 2016. The critically acclaimed production went on tour to Bristol Hippodrome, the Mayflower Theatre, Southampton and Sadler's Wells Theatre, London later in that year.

"Since its formation, Akram Khan Company has become undisputedly one of the foremost innovative dance companies in the world. Khan has become a global icon for his use of collaboration, ensemble production, and especially his unique mix of Kathak and contemporary movement. Akram Khan Company is an associate artist at Sadler’s Wells Theatre and Mountview Academy of Theatre Arts in London and Curve Theatre in Leicester."

In June 2020, Khan had an online conversation with theatre critic and scholar Octavian Saiu. At the end, Saiu asked Khan to send their viewers a direct message for that critical moment during the pandemic. Talking about the importance of moving in a physical and spiritual sense, Khan invited everyone to "take that first step".

He has two children as noted on the pbs show Articulate.

Awards, nominations and recognition

See also

British Bangladeshi
List of British Bangladeshis
What Do Artists Do All Day?

References

External links 

Akram Khan Company website
Archive film of Akram Khan Dance Company performing Kaash ("If") in 2003 at Jacob's Pillow
Mackrell, Judith. All the right moves. The Guardian. 4 April 2001
Gilbert, Jenny. An audience with the rhythm king. The Independent. 20 April 2003
Acocella, Joan. Hard and Fast: What an Indian tradition can do for modern dance. The New Yorker. 23 October 2006
Crisp, Clement. Akram Khan, Sadler’s Wells, London. Financial Times. 17 November 2009
Poulton, Lindsay. Dancer Akram Khan: 'My body is my voice'. The Guardian. 9 December 2009
Mackerell, Judith. MoveTube: Why Akram Khan will command the Olympic stadium. The Guardian. 27 July 2012

Living people
English people of Bangladeshi descent
English male dancers
Contemporary dancers
Helpmann Award winners
National Dance Award winners
People from Wimbledon, London
Alumni of De Montfort University
Members of the Order of the British Empire
Bangladeshi male dancers
Bangladeshi choreographers
1974 births